The 1944 San Francisco Coast Guard Pilots football team was an American football team that represented the United States Coast Guard's Bay and Powell Receiving Station during the 1944 college football season. The team compiled a 4–2–1 record. 

The team was newly organized in 1944 by Lt. Comdr. W. H. Maybaum at the request of a number of men who had returned from the Pacific battle area. Maybaum noted that 75% of the 40 men on the team had seem more than a year overseas.

With the San Francisco Dons football program idle due to the war, the Pilots used the Dons' uniforms and its coaches, Al Tassi and Bill Howard. Emlen Tunnell, later inducted into the Pro Football Hall of Fame, played for the team. Walter Heap, who played quarterback for the Los Angeles Dons after the war, also played for the 1944 Pilots.

Schedule

References

San Francisco Coast Guard Pilots
San Francisco Coast Guard Pilots